Włodzimierz Dąbrowski (11 August 1892 in Cieszyn – 1942 in Auschwitz) was a Polish lawyer and political activist in Silesia.

Dąbrowski participated in the Silesian Uprisings.  He was murdered during World War II by the Germans at Auschwitz concentration camp.

Works
 Rok walki o rządy na Śląsku Cieszyńskim 1919
 Górny Śląsk w walce o zjednoczenie z Polską (Upper Silesia's Struggle for Union with Poland, 1923).

See also 
List of Nazi-German concentration camps
The Holocaust in Poland
World War II casualties of Poland

References

1892 births
1942 deaths
Politicians who died in Nazi concentration camps
Politicians of the Silesian Voivodeship (1920–1939)
20th-century Polish lawyers

People from Cieszyn
Polish civilians killed in World War II
Polish people who died in Auschwitz concentration camp